Zilla Parishad Bhandara or District Council Bhandara is one of the District Councils having jurisdiction on Bhandara district in Maharashtra, India.

History
Zilla Parishad Bhandara was established in 1962 along with 13 Panchayat Samiti. In 1999, Bhandara district  bifurcated into 2 districts and a new district having headquarters in Gondia was created.  Thereafter,  Zilla Parishad Bhandara also divided and new Zilla Parishad for the Gondia district was established by amalgamation with some Panchayat Samiti in it.

Panchayat Samiti
Currently there are seven Panchayat Samiti under jurisdiction  Zilla Parishad Bhandara.

List
1)  Panchayat Samiti Bhandara
2)  Panchayat Samiti Lakhandur
3)  Panchayat Samiti Lakhani
4)  Panchayat Samiti Mohadi
5)  Panchayat Samiti Pauni
6)  Panchayat Samiti Sakoli
7) Panchayat Samiti Tumsar

Zilla Parishad Constituencies
Zilla Parishad Bhandara have 52 District Council Constituencies all over Bhandara district except the urban part of the district, which is administered by Municipal and Notified Area Councils.

References

Bhandara district